Stephen Zimba (born 10 January 2001) is a Zambian boxer. He competed in the men's welterweight event at the 2020 Summer Olympics.

References

External links
 

2001 births
Living people
Zambian male boxers
Olympic boxers of Zambia
Boxers at the 2020 Summer Olympics
Place of birth missing (living people)
Boxers at the 2022 Commonwealth Games
Commonwealth Games silver medallists for Zambia
Commonwealth Games medallists in boxing
Medallists at the 2022 Commonwealth Games